Tapurucuara Airport  is an airport serving the Querari River village of Tapurucuara in the Vaupés Department of Colombia.

See also

Transport in Colombia
List of airports in Colombia

References

External links
OpenStreetMap - Tapurucuara

FallingRain - Tapurucuara Airport
Google Maps - Tapurucuara
HERE/Nokia - Tapurucuara

Airports in Colombia